Jereh Rural District is a rural district (dehestan) in Jereh and Baladeh District, Kazerun County, Fars Province, Iran. At the 2006 census, its population was 14,950, in 3,183 families.  The rural district has 49 villages.

References 

Rural Districts of Fars Province
Kazerun County